Edgar Reinhardt (21 May 1914 – 11 January 1985) was a German field handball player who competed in the 1936 Summer Olympics as part of the German field handball team.  The team won the gold medal. During the competition, Reinhardt played two matches including the final as goalkeeper.

External links
profile

1914 births
1985 deaths
German male handball players
Olympic handball players of Germany
Field handball players at the 1936 Summer Olympics
Olympic gold medalists for Germany
Olympic medalists in handball
Medalists at the 1936 Summer Olympics